Informaţia Zilei (Daily Info) is a Romanian daily newspaper, issued by the Solpress company and focusing mainly on politics, public affairs, sports and economy. The first edition was printed in 1993.

References

External links
 Official website

Newspapers published in Satu Mare
Publications established in 1993